The Sheffield and Hallamshire Championships was an open men's and women's international grass court tennis tournament founded in 1888 as the Sheffield and Hallamshire Tournament. The tournament was played at the  Sheffield and Hallamshire Lawn Tennis Club (f.1885), Sheffield, South Yorkshire, England until 1976 when it was discontinued.

History
The Sheffield and Hallamshire Lawn Tennis Club was founded in November 1885. In 1888 it inaugurated the Sheffield and Hallamshire Tournament played on grass courts in Sheffield, South Yorkshire, England. In 1897 the Sheffield and Hallamshire Tournament was elevated to a county level event and renamed as the Sheffield and Hallamshire Championships. In April 1971 it was added to the new Bio-Strath Circuit of events, and rebranded as the Bio-Strath Sheffield Tournament for that year only.

The winner of the first men's singles champion was British player Mr. G. E. Lowe. The winner of the first women's singles champion was British player Miss. L. Chatterton-Clarke. The final men's singles champion was British player Andrew Jarrett.  The final women's singles champion was Australian player Wendy Gilchrist Paish.

Venue
The original Sheffield and Hallamshire Lawn Tennis Club was founded in 1885. In 1887 the club had three gravel courts, then later expanded to include an additional ten grass courts. Today the club is known as the Hallamshire Tennis, Squash & Racketball Club.

Event Names
 Sheffield and Hallamshire Tournament (1888-1895)
 Sheffield and Hallamshire Championships (1896-1970)
 Bio-Strath Sheffield Tournament (1971)
 Sheffield and Hallamshire Championships (1972–76)

References

Defunct tennis tournaments in the United Kingdom
Grass court tennis tournaments